Muscliff is a suburb of Bournemouth, Dorset.

Education 

 Muscliff Primary School

Politics 
Muscliff is part of the Muscliff and Strouden Park ward for elections to Bournemouth, Christchurch and Poole Council which elect three councillors.

Muscliff is part of the Bournemouth East parliamentary constituency, for elections to the House of Commons of the United Kingdom.

References 

Areas of Bournemouth